Raúl Alcántara (born December 4, 1992) is a Dominican professional baseball pitcher for the Doosan Bears of the KBO League. He previously played in Major League Baseball (MLB) for the Oakland Athletics and in the KBO League for the KT Wiz and Doosan Bears.

Career

Boston Red Sox
Alcántara began his career in the Boston Red Sox organization playing for the Rookie Dominican Summer League Red Sox in 2010. He played for both the Rookie Gulf Coast League Red Sox and Class A Short Season Lowell Spinners in 2011.

Oakland Athletics
On December 28, 2011, Alcántara was traded with Josh Reddick and Miles Head to the Oakland Athletics in exchange for Andrew Bailey and Ryan Sweeney. He played the entirety of the 2012 season with the Class A Burlington Bees. He returned to Class A in 2013 with the Beloit Snappers, but was promoted to the Class A-Advanced Stockton Ports at mid-season. He was added to the Athletics' 40-man roster on November 20, 2013.

Alcántara began the 2014 season with the Double-A Midland RockHounds, but made only three starts before requiring season-ending Tommy John surgery. He returned to play in 2015, making 15 starts at Class A-Advanced Stockton. He played that off season with the Estrellas Orientales of the Dominican Winter League. He began the 2016 season at Double-A, but was promoted to the Triple-A Nashville Sounds on July 20.
Alcántara was called up to the Athletics to make his major league debut on September 5 against the Los Angeles Angels of Anaheim.

Alcántara started the 2017 season in Oakland, but was designated for assignment on April 25 after accumulating a 16.71 ERA in three appearances. His contract was selected from Nashville, and he was added to Oakland's active roster on September 5. He was cleared waivers and was sent outright to Nashville before the 2018 season. Alcantara elected free agency on October 5, 2018.

KT Wiz
On November 18, 2018, Alcántara signed with the KT Wiz of the KBO League. He became a free agent following the season.

Doosan Bears

On December 23, 2019, Alcántara signed a one-year, $700,000 deal with the Doosan Bears of the KBO League. After the season, Alcántara was named the Choi Dong-won Award Winner, the equivalent to the Cy Young award in the KBO, after pitching to a 2.54 ERA with 8.2 K/9 and 1.4 BB/9 over 198.2 innings pitched. He became a free agent following the season.

Hanshin Tigers
On December 23, 2020, Alcántara signed with the Hanshin Tigers of Nippon Professional Baseball. On May 16, 2021, Alcántara made his NPB debut.

Doosan Bears (second stint)
On December 11, 2022, Alcantara signed with the Doosan Bears.

References

External links

 Career statistics - NPB.jp

1992 births
Beloit Snappers players
Burlington Bees players
Dominican Republic expatriate baseball players in the United States
Dominican Republic expatriate baseball players in South Korea
Dominican Summer League Red Sox players
Doosan Bears players
Estrellas Orientales players
Gulf Coast Red Sox players
KBO League pitchers
KT Wiz players
Living people
Lowell Spinners players
Major League Baseball pitchers
Major League Baseball players from the Dominican Republic
Midland RockHounds players
Nashville Sounds players
Oakland Athletics players
People from Barahona Province
Stockton Ports players
Hanshin Tigers players